Cyprinus ilishaestomus is a species of ray-finned fish in the genus Cyprinus. Critically endangered, it inhabits Qiluhu Lake, Yunnan, China.

Notes

References 
 

Cyprinus
Fish described in 1977